The 1960 Lehigh Engineers football team was an American football team that represented Lehigh University during the 1960 NCAA College Division football season. Lehigh finished third in the Middle Atlantic Conference, University Division, and second in the Middle Three Conference.

In their 15th year under head coach William Leckonby, the Engineers compiled a 4–5 record. William Jones was the team captain.

Lehigh finished third in the MAC University Division with a record of 3–2 against conference opponents. The Engineers went 1–1 against the Middle Three, losing to Rutgers and beating Lafayette.

Opening the season with a three-game winning streak, the Engineers rose to No. 3 in the UPI Small College Coaches Poll before a longer streak of five losses pushed them out of the top 20. They finished the year unranked.

Lehigh played its home games at Taylor Stadium on the university campus in Bethlehem, Pennsylvania.

Schedule

References

Lehigh
Lehigh
Lehigh Mountain Hawks football seasons
Lehigh Engineers football